Watkins Lake is a  lake in Waterford Township in Oakland County, Michigan.

It is located north of Watkins Lake Rd and west of Dixie Highway.

Namesake

Watkins Lake was named for a man named Watkins, who, in 1825, was its first white settler. Mr. Watkins settled in sections 22 and 23 on the south shore of the lake.

Fish
Fish in Watkins Lake include bluegill, walleye, perch and rainbow trout.

References

Lakes of Oakland County, Michigan
Lakes of Michigan
Lakes of Waterford Township, Michigan